The Buberlesbach is a small river in Baden-Württemberg, Germany. It flows into the Sommerhaldenbach in Botnang, a Stadtteil of Stuttgart.

See also
List of rivers of Baden-Württemberg

Rivers of Baden-Württemberg
Rivers of Germany